Steven Joseph "Steve" Carl (born December 20, 1984) is an American mixed martial artist. A professional MMA competitor since 2005, Carl previously competed for Bellator from 2010 to 2011 and last competed in the welterweight division for Absolute Championship Akhmat. He is the former WSOF Welterweight Champion.

Background
Carl was a 2003 graduate of Belle Plaine High School, in Belle Plaine, Iowa. While there he enjoyed a successful wrestling career where he qualified for the state tournament in 2001. He was also a S.I.C.L (South Iowa Cedar League) and Sectional Champion in 2003. He graduated from Kirkwood Community College with the class of 2009.

Mixed martial arts career

Early career
While in the Army Carl started training at the Grapplers Lair, after two months of training and no amateur fights Carl made his professional debut on November 5, 2005, against Andrew Perkins, winning the fight via submission (strikes).

Carl went undefeated at 5-0 before taking his first loss to future UFC fighter, Brian Foster. Carl rattled off seven consecutive wins, six of which were finishes, before being signed by Bellator.

Bellator
Carl made his debut for the promotion on April 22, 2010, at Bellator 15 in the Bellator Season 2 Welterweight Tournament. He was matched against Brett Cooper and after three close rounds, Carl won the fight via split decision.

In the semi-final round Carl was matched against Sengoku veteran, Dan Hornbuckle, at Bellator 19. Carl lost the fight midway into the first round via submission, eliminating him from the tournament.

Carl took an off-tournament fight against Tyler Stinson at Bellator 26. Midway into the first round Carl applied a guillotine choke and choked Stinson unconscious. The impressive win earned him entry into the next season Welterweight Tournament. However, Carl injured his foot and was unable to compete in the tournament.

Carl entered into the Bellator Season Five Welterweight Tournament, and was matched against the tournament favorite Douglas Lima. The fight took place at Bellator 49. Carl lost the fight via unanimous decision. Carl was released from the promotion after the loss.

Post-Bellator
In December 2011 Carl made his post-Bellator debut fighting for Far Eastern Federation of Modern Pankration in Russia. He defeated Rustam Bogatirev via submission in the first round.

On March 2, 2012, Carl fought Mason Temiquel, taking the fight on only one day's notice, winning via submission and then on July 28, 2012, later defeated Vic Hall via submission, both in the first round. Carl defeated Andrew Trace via first round submission at Madtown Throwdown on August 11, 2012.

World Series of Fighting
In late 2012, Carl signed with upstart Las Vegas promotion World Series of Fighting. His debut came at the promotion's first event, World Series of Fighting 1, held on November 3, 2012, against Ramico Blackmon. Steve Carl won the fight via rear naked choke submission in the first round.

Steve Carl defeated Tyson Steele on June 14, 2013, at WSOF 3 via rear-naked choke submission in round one.

Steve Carl fought Josh Burkman and won via triangle choke submission in the fourth round at WSOF 6 to become the first WSOF Welterweight Championship.

Carl made his first title defense at WSOF 9 on March 29, 2014, against UFC vet Rousimar Palhares. He lost the bout due to submission in the first round.

The Ultimate Fighter: American Top Team vs. Blackzilians

Steve Carl was confirmed as a cast member for The Ultimate Fighter 21 representing American Top Team.

Championships and accomplishments
World Series of Fighting
WSOF Welterweight Championship (First, one time)

Mixed martial arts record

|-
|Loss
|align=center|22–6
|Beslan Isaev
| Decision (unanimous)
| |ACB 49: Rostov Onslaught
|November 26, 2016
|align=center|3
|align=center|5:00
|Rostov-on-Don, Russia
|
|-
|Loss
|align=center|22–5
| Belal Muhammad 
| TKO (punches)
|Titan FC 38: Carl vs. Muhammad
|April 30, 2016
|align=center|4
|align=center|4:07
|Florida, United States
|For The Titan FC Welterweight Title.
|-
|Win
|align=center|22–4
| Beslan Ushukov
| Submission (rear-naked choke)
|Akhmat Fight Show 13: Battle in Grozny
|December 26, 2015
|align=center|3
|align=center|3:17
|Grozny, Russia
|
|-
|Loss
|align=center|21–4
| Rousimar Palhares
| Submission (inverted heel hook)
|WSOF 9
|March 29, 2014
|align=center|1
|align=center|1:09
|Las Vegas, Nevada, United States
|Lost the WSOF Welterweight Championship.
|-
|Win
|align=center| 21–3
| Joshua Burkman
| Technical Submission (triangle choke)
|WSOF 6
|October 26, 2013
|align=center|4
|align=center|1:02
|Coral Gables, Florida, United States
|Won the inaugural WSOF Welterweight Championship.
|-
|Win
|align=center|20–3
|Tyson Steele
|Submission (rear-naked choke)
|WSOF 3
|
|align=center|1
|align=center|1:32
|Las Vegas, Nevada, United States
|
|-
|Win
|align=center|19–3
|Ramico Blackmon
|Submission (rear-naked choke)
|WSOF 1
|
|align=center|1
|align=center|2:11
|Las Vegas, Nevada, United States
|
|-
|Win
|align=center|18–3
|Andrew Trace
|Submission (rear-naked choke)
|Madtown Throwdown 28
|
|align=center|1
|align=center|0:55
|Madison, Wisconsin, United States
|
|-
|Win
|align=center|17–3
|Vic Hall
|Submission (rear-naked choke)
|Extreme Challenge 216
|
|align=center|1
|align=center|1:25
|Cedar Rapids, Iowa, United States
|
|-
|Win
|align=center|16–3
|Mason Temiquel
|Submission (kimura)
|Midwest Cage Championship 39
|
|align=center|1
|align=center|3:01
|Des Moines, Iowa, United States
|
|-
|Win
|align=center|15–3
|Rustam Bogatirev
|Submission (triangle choke)
|FEFoMP: Battle of Empires
|
|align=center|1
|align=center|3:50
|Khabarovsk Krai, Russia
|
|-
|Loss
|align=center|14–3
|Douglas Lima
|Decision (unanimous)
|Bellator 49
|
|align=center|3
|align=center|5:00
|Atlantic City, New Jersey, United States
|Season Five Welterweight Tournament Quarterfinals.
|-
|Win
|align=center|14–2
|Tyler Stinson
|Technical Submission (guillotine choke)
|Bellator 26
|
|align=center|1
|align=center|2:30
|Kansas City, Missouri, United States
|
|-
|Loss
|align=center|13–2
|Dan Hornbuckle
|Submission (kimura)
|Bellator 19
|
|align=center|1
|align=center|2:31
|Grand Prairie, Texas, United States
|Season Two Welterweight Tournament Semifinals.
|-
|Win
|align=center|13–1
|Brett Cooper
|Decision (split)
|Bellator 15
|
|align=center|3
|align=center|5:00
|Uncasville, Connecticut, United States
|Season Two Welterweight Tournament Quarterfinals.
|-
|Win
|align=center|12–1
|Mo Spears
|Submission (punches)
|Warriors 4 Warriors 2
|
|align=center|1
|align=center|1:19
|Iowa City, Iowa, United States
|
|-
|Win
|align=center|11–1
|Victor Moreno
|Submission (armbar)
|MFDM: Maxfights 1
|
|align=center|1
|align=center|1:32
|Des Moines, Iowa, United States
|
|-
|Win
|align=center|10–1
|Ivan Ivanov
|Submission (rear-naked choke)
|M-1 Challenge: 2009 Selections 3
|
|align=center|1
|align=center|3:31
|Bourgas, Bulgaria
|
|-
|Win
|align=center|9–1
|Matt Delanoit
|Submission (triangle choke)
|Midwest Cage Championships 18
|
|align=center|3
|align=center|1:27
|Des Moines, Iowa, United States
|
|-
|Win
|align=center|8–1
|James Warfield
|Decision (unanimous)
|Warriors 4 Warriors 1
|
|align=center|3
|align=center|5:00
|Cedar Rapids, Iowa, United States
|
|-
|Win
|align=center|7–1
|Brian Green
|TKO (punches)
|Conquest Fighting Championship 1
|
|align=center|1
|align=center|3:34
|Des Moines, Iowa, United States
|
|-
|Win
|align=center|6–1
|Conan Cano
|Submission (guillotine choke)
|King of Kombat 4
|
|align=center|1
|align=center|0:59
|Austin, Texas, United States
|
|-
|Loss
|align=center|5–1
|Brian Foster
|TKO (punches)
|Masters of the Cage 7
|
|align=center|1
|align=center|4:34
|Norman, Oklahoma, United States
|
|-
|Win
|align=center|5–0
|Raheem Williams
|Submission
|Renegades Extreme Fighting
|
|align=center|2
|align=center|2:59
|Houston, Texas, United States
|
|-
|Win
|align=center|4–0
|James White
|Submission
|Ultimate Texas Showdown 5
|
|align=center|1
|align=center|2:25
|Texas, United States
|
|-
|Win
|align=center|3–0
|Brandon Berkey
|TKO (punches)
|Ultimate Texas Showdown 4
|
|align=center|2
|align=center|2:08
|Texas, United States
|
|-
|Win
|align=center|2–0
|Henry Buchanan
|Decision (unanimous)
|Renegades Extreme Fighting 
|
|align=center|3
|align=center|5:00
|Austin, Texas, United States
|
|-
|Win
|align=center|1–0
|Andrew Perkins
|Submission (punches) 
|Xtreme Fight Championship 4
|
|align=center|1
|align=center|N/A
|Fort Smith, Arkansas, United States
|

Mixed martial arts exhibition record

|-
|Loss
|align=center|0–2
| Kamaru Usman
| Decision (unanimous)
|The Ultimate Fighter 21
|June 17, 2015 (airdate)
|align=center|2
|align=center|5:00
|Coconut Creek, Florida, United States
|
|-
|Loss
|align=center|0–1
| Valdir Araújo
| Submission (guillotine choke)
|The Ultimate Fighter 21
|May 6, 2015 (airdate)
|align=center|2
|align=center|4:13
|Boca Raton, Florida, United States
|

References

External links

Bellator Profile

1984 births
Living people
American male mixed martial artists
Mixed martial artists from Iowa
Welterweight mixed martial artists
Mixed martial artists utilizing wrestling
United States Army personnel of the Iraq War
United States Army soldiers
People from Belle Plaine, Iowa
Kirkwood Community College alumni